is an action-adventure video game developed by Nintendo and Human Entertainment and published by Nintendo for the Family Computer Disk System. It was released exclusively in Japan on April 14, 1986. The game was one of the early games released for the system, and the second original game after The Legend of Zelda. The game was released outside Japan for the first time on the Nintendo 3DS Virtual Console in Europe and Australia in May 2014 and in North America in August 2014.

Gameplay

The player takes on the role of the main protagonist Takamaru. The objective is to race through Murasame Castle and the four neighboring castles, obtain the four gems from the castle lords and defeat the main antagonist Murasame. The player moves from different directions in a top-down view with no side-scrolling. The game has only a limited number of power-ups, forcing players to rely on their own action skills more than anything else.

The game world has scrolls scattered throughout the castles for Takamaru to collect, and special raccoon suits may reveal power-ups. Players are given a certain number of lives, and may gain additional lives by rescuing the castles' princesses and playing through bonus rounds after completing the first half of each level. One life is lost when Takamaru's health gauge runs out or he runs out of time. When all lives are lost at any point in the game, the game over screen will appear, in which the player can continue the game or save their progress.

The game consists of five castles: Aosame Castle, Akasame Castle, Ryokusame Castle, Momosame Castle, and the titular Murasame Castle. The appearance of enemy characters (including samurai, ninja and hannya) borrows heavily from existing Japanese culture. Each level, divided into two parts: the path to the castle, and the castle itself, is of considerable size, and Takamaru must defeat generic enemy characters to reach the innermost region of the castle where the castle-lord resides.

The player's only weapons are a katana and shurikens; upgrades to the shuriken can be obtained, but are lost whenever Takamaru loses a life. The katana can only be used when Takamaru is close to an enemy or projectile (excluding fireballs), while the shurikens can only be used when he is farther away. The katana can also be used to deflect projectiles. Other items include fireballs, which are more powerful than the shurikens; a lightning-themed explosive, which gives heavy damage to every enemy on screen; and a cloak, which makes Takamaru invisible and invulnerable to enemies and objects for a short period of time. When Takamaru reaches more than 99 lives, he becomes invincible.

Plot
In Edo-period Japan, Murasame Castle houses a gigantic stone statue known as Murasame. The people lived peacefully until one stormy night, when a shining golden object fell onto the castle from the sky. Deafening shrieks arose from the castle, and the shining object is later revealed to be an alien creature who gives life to the stone statue Murasame and takes over the castle. The alien creature extends its power to four other neighboring castles, giving the daimyō lords each an evil sphere of power. The lords are taken over by the alien's evil power, and use the spheres to summon ninja armies and monsters to attack villagers. Hearing of these strange occurrences, the shogunate led by Tokugawa Ietsuna sends Takamaru, a samurai apprentice, on a secret mission to investigate the castle. As Takamaru, the player must infiltrate the four castles to defeat each castle lord, before going on to face the alien entity itself.

Development 
Due to the game’s initial obscurity, not much about its development is known. However, Goichi Suda, in an interview with Nintendo Life, stated that Human Entertainment (where he started video game development) was involved in development of the game to some degree.

Release
The Mysterious Murasame Castle was released for the Famicom Disk System on April 14, 1986 in Japan. It was ported to Game Boy Advance on August 10, 2004 as part of the Famicom Mini Series in Japan. It was released on Virtual Console in Japan for Wii on August 19, 2008 and for Wii U on July 30, 2014. It was released on Virtual Console for Nintendo 3DS in Japan on July 3, 2013, in Europe and Australia on May 29, 2014, and in North America on August 7, 2014; this was the first time the game had been released in the West.

In June 2010, the game was featured amongst others from the Nintendo Entertainment System and Super NES as part of a tech demo called Classic Games at E3 2010.

Reception

Nintendo Life's Marcel van Duyn gave the 3DS virtual console re-release of The Mysterious Murasame Castle a rating of 8/10 stating "It's anyone's guess as to why it took so long for this game to finally be released outside Japan, but it is without a doubt a very welcome release. The Mysterious Murasame Castle is unlike any other Nintendo game of the time, with incredibly fast-paced gameplay and a high degree of difficulty which, thankfully, manages to feel completely fair. With all of the references the game has had in recent years, you're now finally able to see what the fuss is all about".

Den of Geek rated The Mysterious Murasame Castle 3.5/5 for the release of the 3DS Virtual Console version in North America.

Legacy
A television drama of the same name was produced by Fuji Television in 1986 with a plot loosely based around that of the game. This show is considered lost. No footage of it has survived, and information about it is sparse, amounting to only an initial announcement. While The Mysterious Murasame Castle never received a proper sequel, the game as well as Takamaru have made several appearances in other video games. In the GameCube game Pikmin 2, one of the objects found in the game is The Mysterious Murasame Castle game disk. In the Wii game Captain Rainbow, Takamaru appears as a supporting character. In the Wii game Super Smash Bros. Brawl, a song titled "Nazo no Murasamejo - Douchuumen", based on the overworld theme heard before entering the castles, appears as an unlockable song for the Mario Bros. stage, along with Takamaru himself as one of the many unlockable stickers. In the Nintendo DS game WarioWare D.I.Y., one of the microgames in the Japanese version is based on this game, which was replaced with a Pikmin microgame in non-Japanese versions. In the Wii version of Samurai Warriors 3, Takamaru (voiced by Hiroshi Okamoto in Japanese and Darrel Guilbeau in English) appears as a bonus character in the "Murasame castle" mode. The series is also featured in Nintendo Land for the Wii U as Takamaru's Ninja Castle. Takamaru appears as an Assist Trophy in Super Smash Bros. for Nintendo 3DS and Wii U and is voiced by Tomokazu Sugita; when summoned, he uses his signature Multidirectional Pinwheel Knife Rook Attack. Takamaru was originally considered to be a playable character in Super Smash Bros. for Nintendo 3DS and Wii U, but was cut because he was not recognized as much as other Nintendo characters; with his main theme being used in the Duck Hunt stage.

During a 2015 Super Smash Bros. for Nintendo 3DS and Wii U presentation, a downloadable Mii Fighter costume based on Takamaru for the Mii Swordfighter was revealed. It was released alongside the rest of the DLC on February 3, 2016.

In Super Smash Bros. Ultimate, Takamaru's assist trophy and Mii costume returns. He also appears as a Spirit, one of the game's collectibles.

In Super Mario Maker 2, the "Ninja Attack!" sound effect causes Takamaru and ninja enemies from the game to appear on-screen.

Goichi Suda expressed desire to remake the game for modern times.

Notes

References

External links 
 Official Wii U Virtual Console version website 
 Official Wii Virtual Console version website 
 Official GBA version website 

1986 video games
Action-adventure games
Famicom Disk System games
Game Boy Advance games
Nintendo Entertainment Analysis and Development games
Video games about samurai
Video games developed in Japan
Video games set in castles
Video games set in feudal Japan
Video games scored by Koji Kondo
Virtual Console games
Virtual Console games for Wii U
Virtual Console games for Nintendo 3DS